Desmiphora lanuginosa is a species of beetle in the family Cerambycidae first described by Stephan von Breuning in 1942 and occurs in Brazil.

References

Desmiphora
Beetles described in 1942